Ron & Carol Cope Stadium at Foster Field is a football stadium located in Kearney, Nebraska, U.S., on the University of Nebraska at Kearney campus. In 2005, the university named the stadium after Ron and Carol Cope, who were long-time supporters of the University of Nebraska system. The field is named after Charlie Foster, a former coach and athletic director at Nebraska–Kearney.

Renovations
The stadium had an outdoor track surrounding Foster Field until the early 2000s. After the 2003 season, a FieldTurf surface was installed. The first game played on the new field was on September 3. The Lopers won over Wayne State in front of 3,804 fans.
 
The complete renovation of the stadium totaled out to be over $7.2 million, which was completed during the 2005 season.
The stadium is three stories tall, and includes concession stands, restrooms, and ticket booths. The third floor has a large hospitality room that seats, coaches and radio booths, game-day operations rooms and the press box.
 
An LED message center and scoreboard was added at the South end zone, as well. The North end zone is a facility that contains the locker rooms, meeting rooms, athletic training facilities, officials' quarters, and equipment storage.

Other uses
The women's soccer team has played at Cope Stadium since 2009. The program's first regular season game drew 3,227 fans, setting a Division II record that still stands.

Kearney High School also uses the stadium for their home football games. The Nebraska School Activities Association's yearly state championships for high school six-man football are also held at Cope Stadium; eight-man and standard 11-man games are held at University of Nebraska-Lincoln's Memorial Stadium.

References

External links
 Cope Stadium at Foster Field - www.lopers.com
 Nebraska–Kearney athletics

College football venues
American football venues in Nebraska
Nebraska–Kearney Lopers football
Buildings and structures in Kearney, Nebraska
Sports in the Tri-Cities, Nebraska
1939 establishments in Nebraska
Sports venues completed in 1939
College soccer venues in the United States
Soccer venues in Nebraska
High school football venues in the United States